Antonio Gattorno (born Havana, March 15, 1904 - died Acushnet, Massachusetts, 1980) was a Cuban painter. He was a distinguished member of the first generation of modern Cuban painters.

Early life
He studied at the Academy of San Alejandro in that city before winning a scholarship, in 1919, which allowed him to travel to Europe for further study.  There he encountered Mannerism and social realism, which together with the work of Paul Gauguin would form the major influence on his work; during his sojourn he roomed with sculptor Juan José Sicre.

Career
After completing college he returned to Cuba in 1926, and the following year-a time noted for its importance to modern art in Cuba-exhibited his works such as Mujeres en el Río, a Deco representation of an idyllic tropical scene based on monumental female nudes. He became part of the "Vanguardia", along with Victor Manuel, Amelia Peláez, and Wifredo Lam.  He became an instructor at his alma mater, and executed public murals around Cuba. Gattorno developed his mature style in the early 1930s, concentrating on the depiction of Cuban peasants and their environment. The paintings that resulted from his maturity as an artist fluctuated between idyllic views of the Cuban countryside and criticism of Cuba's social conditions. In contrast to his radiant representation of nature and indications of a pastoral way of life, Gattorno depicted the guajiro as being emaciated and sad due to impoverished conditions. Given the representation of the land as radiant and bountiful, the most likely culprit for his peasants' look of dejection and impoverishment would have been the social system.

Gattorno's association with socialist leaning writers tend to confirm the interpretation of some of his guajiro figures as a social critique of life in the Cuban countryside of the 1930s. His major contribution to his generation's discourse of national ethos was an idealized vision of the land and a critical view of its most humble inhabitants, making both the primary symbols of Cuba. His first exhibition in the United States, in 1936, was sponsored by Ernest Hemingway and John Dos Passos.  In 1940 he married Portuguese-American Isabella Cabral and moved to Greenwich Village; he visited Cuba again only in 1946, but spent the next thirty years in New York City.  He remained in the United States for most of the rest of his career, in the process alienating many in the Cuban art community.  He died in Massachusetts in 1980.

References

Sources
Alonso, Alejandro G., Contreras, Pedro, and Fagiuoli, Martino (2007). Havana Deco. New York: W.W. Norton and Company, .
Martínez, Juan (1994). Cuban Art and National Identity. Florida: University Press Florida. .
Poupeye, Veerle (1998). Caribbean Art. London; Thames and Hudson; .

External links
Antonio Gattorno. A Cuban Painter for the World. Gattorno Foundation. passion4art.com. Retrieved on 15 February 2010.
Antonio Gattorno. Biography. Gattorno Foundation. passion4art.com. Retrieved on 15 February 2010.

1904 births
1980 deaths
Cuban painters
Cuban expatriates in the United States
20th-century American painters
American male painters
20th-century American male artists
Academia Nacional de Bellas Artes San Alejandro alumni